A medical tattoo is a tattoo used to treat a condition, communicate information, or mark a body location.

Historical uses 
A crude practice of corneal tattooing was performed by Galen in 150 CE. He tried to cover leucomatous opacities of the cornea by cauterizing the surface with a heated stilet and applying powdered nutgalls and iron or pulverized pomegranate bark mixed with copper salt; the practice was revived in the 1800s. With the rise of Christianity, tattooing declined and eventually became banned by a papal edict in 787 CE. The practice of corneal tattooing was revived by Louis de Wecker in the 1870s.

To provide medical information 
During the Cold War, threats of nuclear warfare led several U.S. states to consider blood type tattooing. Programs were spurred in Chicago, Utah and Indiana based on the premise that if an atomic bomb were to strike, the resulting damage would require extremely large amounts of blood within a short amount of time.

Similar to dog tags, members of the U.S. military may have their vital information tattooed on themselves, usually on the rib cage below the armpit; they are referred to as "meat tags".

Tattoos have also been used to provide notice to emergency personnel that a person has diabetes mellitus; people with this condition may fall into a diabetic coma and be unable to communicate that information.

For radiation treatment 
Tattoos have been used as fiducial markers as an aid in guiding radiotherapy. Similarly, Scott Kelly utilized marker tattoos in the positioning of sonogram probes for multiple checks for atherosclerosis while on a long-duration mission on the International Space Station.

Paramedical tattoos 
A paramedical tattoo is a cosmetic tattoo applied because of a medical condition or to disguise the results of its treatment.

During breast reconstruction after mastectomy (removal of the breast for treatment of cancer), or breast reduction surgery, tattooing is sometimes used to replace the areola which has been removed during mastectomy, or to fill in areas of pigment loss which may occur during breast reduction performed with a free nipple graft technique. Since September 2011, the Royal Derby Hospital offers free nipple tattoos for breast surgery patients in order to mask the scars of surgery. The purchase of the tattoo device was funded by the Ashbourne Breast Cancer Walk. Vinnie Myers of Little Vinnie's Tattoos in Finksburg, Maryland, has performed nipple tattoos on over 5,000 women who have undergone surgery for breast cancer, including those of Caitlin Kiernan, who wrote a story about Mr. Myers in The New York Times. A similar service offered without charge in 2017 by a cosmetic tattooist in the UK was booked up six months ahead. Another option some people choose after mastectomy is to get a decorative tattoo on the chest as body art instead of a reconstruction.

Other uses include simulating the appearance of fingernails and covering scars. Micropigmentation (permanent makeup) can be used to reduce the visibility of vitiligo areas on the skin.

See also
 SS blood group tattoo

References

Tattooing and medicine